Ravne pri Cerknem is a settlement west of Cerkno in the traditional Littoral region of Slovenia.

The parish church in the settlement is dedicated to Saint Ulrich and belongs to the Koper Diocese.

References

External links

Ravne pri Cerknem on Geopedia

Populated places in the Municipality of Cerkno